Jerry McLain Wallace (born April 1935) is an American theologian, ordained minister, and academic administrator who served as the 4th president of Campbell University in Buies Creek, North Carolina.

Early life and education
A native of Rockingham, North Carolina, Wallace earned a Bachelor of Arts degree in English and Government from East Carolina University. An ordained Baptist minister, Wallace received the Bachelor of Divinity and Master of Theology degrees from Southeastern Baptist Theological Seminary. He also earned a Master of Science in Sociology and Doctor of Education in Higher Education Administration, both from North Carolina State University.

Career 
Wallace first joined the faculty of Campbell University in 1970, later serving as the vice president for Academic Affairs and provost from 1984 to 2001 before becoming president in 2003.

In 2011, the Campbell University School of Osteopathic Medicine was established and named in Wallace's honor. Wallace retired in 2015, and was succeeded by theologian and minister J. Bradley Creed.

References

East Carolina University alumni
Presidents of Campbell University
Living people
1935 births
People from Buies Creek, North Carolina
People from Rockingham, North Carolina
Baptists from North Carolina